Lebedyansky District is an administrative and municipal district (raion), one of the eighteen in Lipetsk Oblast, Russia. It is located in the northern central part of the oblast. Its administrative center is the town of Lebedyan. Population:  46,644 (2002 Census);  The population of Lebedyan accounts for 49.3% of the district's total population.

References

Notes

Sources

Districts of Lipetsk Oblast